Motion Picture Sound Editors (M.P.S.E.) is an American honorary society of motion picture sound editors founded in 1953. The society's goals are to educate others about and increase the recognition of the sound editors, show the artistic merit of the soundtracks, and improve the professional relationship of its members. The society is not to be confused with an industry union, such as the I.A.T.S.E. The current president is Mark Lanza. The names of active members of the MPSE will generally appear in film credits with the post-nominal letters "MPSE".

Membership requirements
The following are required for the membership application:
 A three-year list of credits as one (or more) of the following:
 Sound editor
 Sound designer
 Dialogue editor
 ADR editor
 Sound effects editor
 Foley artist
 Music editor
 Two active MPSE member sponsors
 One letter of a sponsoring active MPSE member

Golden Reel Awards
Since 1983, The Golden Reel Awards are an annual ceremony dedicated to honoring outstanding achievement in sound editing in film, television, and across the entertainment industry.

Feature Film categories
 Golden Reel Award for Outstanding Achievement in Sound Editing – Dialogue and ADR for Feature Film
 Golden Reel Award for Outstanding Achievement in Sound Editing – Sound Effects and Foley for Feature Film
 Golden Reel Award for Outstanding Achievement in Sound Editing – Feature Music
 Golden Reel Award for Outstanding Achievement in Sound Editing – Musical for Feature Film (until 2020)
 Golden Reel Award for Outstanding Achievement in Sound Editing – Sound Effects, Foley, Dialogue and ADR for Animated Feature Film
 Golden Reel Award for Outstanding Achievement in Sound Editing – Sound Effects, Foley, Dialogue and ADR for Foreign Language Feature Film
 Golden Reel Award for Outstanding Achievement in Sound Editing – Sound Effects, Foley, Dialogue and ADR for Feature Documentary

Broadcast Media categories
 Golden Reel Award for Outstanding Achievement in Sound Editing – Series 1 Hour – Dialogue/ADR
 Golden Reel Award for Outstanding Achievement in Sound Editing – Series 1 Hour – Effects / Foley
 Golden Reel Award for Outstanding Achievement in Sound Editing – Non-Theatrical Feature
 Golden Reel Award for Outstanding Achievement in Sound Editing – Non-Theatrical Animation
 Golden Reel Award for Outstanding Achievement in Sound Editing – Series 1 Hour – Comedy or Drama – Music
 Golden Reel Award for Outstanding Achievement in Sound Editing - Music Score and Musical for Episodic Short Form Broadcast Media (until 2020)
 Golden Reel Award for Outstanding Achievement in Sound Editing – 1/2 Hour – Comedy or Drama
 Golden Reel Award for Outstanding Achievement in Sound Editing – Animation Series or Short
 Golden Reel Award for Outstanding Achievement in Sound Editing – Non-Theatrical Documentary
 Golden Reel Award for Outstanding Achievement in Sound Editing – Limited Series or Anthology
 Golden Reel Award for Outstanding Achievement in Sound Editing – Dialogue and ADR for Episodic Short Form Broadcast Media (until 2020)
 Golden Reel Award for Outstanding Achievement in Sound Editing – Sound Effects and Foley for Episodic Short Form Broadcast Media (until 2020)

Gaming
 Best Sound Editing: Computer Entertainment
 2000: Starlancer
 2002: Ambush
 2004: Terminator 3: Rise of the Machines
 2005: GoldenEye: Rogue Agent
 2006: Onimusha: Dawn of Dreams
 2007: Hellgate: London
 2008: StarCraft II: Wings of Liberty
 2009: Gears of War 2
 2010: Uncharted 2: Among Thieves
 2011: Epic Mickey
 2012: Need for Speed: The Run
 2013: Resident Evil 6
 2014: StarCraft II: Heart of the Swarm
 2015: League of Legends: A New Dawn
 2016: Halo 5: Guardians
 2017: Gears of War 4
 2018: Halo Wars 2

Special categories 
 Career Achievement Award
 Filmmaker's Award
 Verna Fields Award for Sound Editing in a Student Film
 Ethel Crutcher Scholarship

Award design and adoption
The current Golden Reel Award design was introduced on March 31, 1984, at the award ceremonies for the year 1983 held at the Beverly Wilshire Hotel Grand Ballroom, Beverly Hills, California. The trophy was designed by Pat and Ken Anderson of the Anderson Trophy Company. The award statues are made by New York firm, Society Awards.

References

External links
 
 

 
Entertainment industry societies
American film awards
Film organizations in the United States
Organizations established in 1953
1953 establishments in the United States